Varysburg is a  village located at the intersection of U.S. Route 20A and New York State Route 98. It is in the eastern portion of the town of Sheldon close to the border with Orangeville in Wyoming County, New York, United States. As per the 2010 census the population of the Varysburg ZIP Code area (14167), which included part of the town of Orangeville, was 1,646.

References

	

Census-designated places in New York (state)
Villages in New York (state)
Villages in Wyoming County, New York